US Global Development Lab is serving as innovation hub powered by USAID. It is working to produce development innovations by testing and scaling proven solutions to reach hundreds of millions of people living in extreme poverty and other global challenges.

History 
US Global Development Lab launched on April 3, 2014  to increase the application of science, technology, innovation, and partnerships to end extreme poverty and promote inclusive economic growth. The aim of this new entity within USAID the end of extreme poverty by 2030.

Global impact 
US Global Development Lab focusing on Clean energy, clean Water, early Childhood to Primary education, health delivery, livelihoods, living Conditions, sanitation, secondary Education, women's Education and youth Job Skills. At UCLA, it provides a results-driven space for research, incubate, and implement innovative ideas to the alleviate poverty.

The U.S. Global Development Lab seeks to be a mechanism for taking ideas to change-making action. It partnered with UC Berkeley to create the Global Development Fellows Program to support cutting edge solutions to address sustainable development challenges in developing countries. It also funded Ebola Support Contract to eliminate this growing disease.

References

External links 
 

International development agencies
Laboratories in California
University and college laboratories in the United States
Organizations established in 2014
2014 establishments in California
University of California, Berkeley
University of California, Los Angeles